Reisdorf is a village in the German state of Bavaria, about 25 miles north of Munich.  It is part of the municipality of Schweitenkirchen, in the district of Pfaffenhofen.

References

Pfaffenhofen (district)
Villages in Bavaria